The 1957 Sacramento State Hornets football team represented Sacramento State College—now known as California State University, Sacramento—as a member of the Far Western Conference (FWC) during the 1957 NCAA College Division football season. Led by first-year head coach John W. Baker, Sacramento State compiled an overall record of 5–4 with a mark of 2–3 in conference play, placing fourth in the FWC. The team finished with the first winning record in its four years of existence. For the season Sacramento State was outscored by its opponents 174 to 173. The Hornets played home games at Grant Stadium in Sacramento, California.

Schedule

Notes

References

Sacramento State
Sacramento State Hornets football seasons
Sacramento State Hornets football